The United Kingdom Common Frameworks are a group of legislative and non- legislative policies that aim to create UK wide frameworks and ensure the security and integrity of the UK internal market.

Some of these policies will fall under devolved competence, and others it plans to reserve for central government.

To create a common UK-wide policy area, some policies will require memorandums of understanding and other areas it will declare as reserved matters.

History 
On 13 July 2017, the European Union Withdrawal Bill, to govern the UK exit from the EU and make provisions for certain EU laws to be retained where necessary, had its first reading in the House of Commons.

At the end of the transition period, the 160 to 290 EU policies cease to apply to the UK and must be replaced by the United Kingdom's own common framework policies. Some policies are defined by the Northern Ireland Protocol.

On 15 March 2018, the Government of the United Kingdom published a list of common framework policies that it had been sharing as a member of the European Union and that will need to be reassigned following Brexit.

On 23 July 2017 the Scottish government introduced the UK Withdrawal from the European Union (Legal Continuity) (Scotland) Bill into the Scottish Parliament. On 17 April 2018, the UK Government intervened and referred the Bill to the UK Supreme Court to challenge its legality and get a ruling on whether its provisions of the were outwith the legal competence of the Scottish Government and Parliament. On 13 December 2018 the UK Supreme Court ruled that the provisions of the bill would exceed the statutory power of the Scottish Government and Parliament, and the bill was sent back for editing: in the light of the ruling, the Scottish Government abandoned it.

On 26 June 2019, the European Withdrawal Bill passed through Parliament, received Royal Assent, and became an Act.

Objectives 
The UK Government proposes to establish common frameworks where it considers them necessary:

 to allow the UK internal market to continue functioning, while acknowledging policy divergence;
 to allow the United Kingdom to continue meeting its international obligations;
 Ensure the UK can negotiate, enter into and implement new trade agreements and international treaties; 
 enable the management of common resources;
 to provide administrative support and  access to justice in legal case that involve international dispute resolution; and
 safeguard the security of the UK.

Implementation process for legislative and non-legislative frameworks

Non-legislative common frameworks (implementation process) 
The Government's proposed implementation process is divided into 5 phases:

Key

🔹 = End of phase agreement

🔰 = Task

Phase 1

🔰 Agreement of framework principles

🔰 First Phase of multilateral “deep dives”

Phase 2

🔰 Continued multilateral agreement

🔰 Development of required frameworks legislation

🔰 Beginning of bilateral stakeholders engagement

🔰 Light-touch review and scrutiny of framework outlines

🔹 Outline framework

Phase 3

🔰 Policy Finalisation

🔰 External stakeholder engagement

🔰 In-depth review and assessment process

🔰 Collective agreement on policy approach
 
🔹 Provisional framework agreement

🔰 Required reappraisal of framework based on outcomes of cross - cutting issues  (Phase 4 +5)

Phase 4

🔰 Required legislation in parliamentary passage

🔰 Framework preparation and implementation

🔹 Framework agreement

Phase 5

🔰 Post implementations arrangements

These talks are to be held between the UK Government and the individual Devolved Governments, and the finished frameworks are then subject to agreement in the Joint Ministerial Committee (JMC)

Legislative common frameworks
Below are the 24 Policy areas where the United Kingdom Government plans to create Common Framework Polices for after Brexit using legislation.

Common frameworks using alternate implementing methods
Below are 79 policy areas that the Government says  will require secondary legislation such legislative consent motions

See also

Intergovernmental arrangements
 Constitution of the United Kingdom 
 Intergovernmental relations in the United Kingdom
 Politics of the United Kingdom
 United Kingdom constitutional law

Foreign affairs
 Foreign relations of the United Kingdom
 Free trade agreements of the United Kingdom

UK internal market
 UK Internal Market Bill

Footnotes

References 

Constitution of the United Kingdom
Devolution in the United Kingdom
Statutory Instruments of the United Kingdom